The Street Is Ours! is a 1987 Burkinabé film. The film was awarded the "Grand Prix du Jury" at the :Entrevues Belfort film festival in 1987 and was shown at the Clermont-Ferrand International Short Film Festival in 1988.

Plot 
The film depicts the after-school life of children in Ouagadougou.

When school is out, the children take over the street. This is where they learn to fight and steal, where they fall in love and play football, where they dance, cook, make toys or musical instruments, keep shop... All the resourcefulness of these children from Burkina Faso is featured in a series of quick and humorous sketches.

References

External links 

1987 short films
1987 films
Burkinabé comedy films
Burkinabé short films
Comedy short films